Jordan Floyd (born May 22, 1997) is an American professional basketball player for JL Bourg of the French LNB Pro A. He played college basketball for the King Tornado and the Albany State Golden Rams.

High school career
Floyd was a four-year varsity basketball starter for Westover Comprehensive High School in Albany, Georgia. He was a first-team all-state and 4A-1 all-region first team selection as a senior. Floyd had expected to play NCAA Division I basketball following high school, but his recruitment slowed down after he broke his wrist in his senior season. On April 30, 2015, he signed his National Letter of Intent to play NCAA Division II basketball for Albany State. Floyd also played baseball in high school.

College career
As a freshman at Albany State, Floyd averaged 9.9 points, 2.5 rebounds and 1.5 assists per game, before transferring to King, another Division II program. In his sophomore season, he averaged 9.3 points and 2.7 assists per game. As a junior, Floyd averaged 21.7 points, 2.3 assists and two rebounds per game and was unanimously selected as Conference Carolinas Player of the Year. He led his team to the regular season conference title. Floyd fractured his left ankle in his only game in the following season and was granted a medical redshirt. 

As a senior, Floyd averaged a Division II-high 31.9 points, 4.1 rebounds and 2.7 assists per game for King. Floyd set the school single-game scoring record with 43 points in a win over Mount Olive. He eclipsed his own record by scoring a career-high 47 points in a February 20, 2020 win over Erskine. On March 3, 2020, he became King's all-time leading scorer, surpassing Mark Dockery. Floyd was named Ron Lenz National Player of the Year, as well as Conference Carolinas Player of the Year for his second time. He earned Division II All-American honors from the National Association of Basketball Coaches.

Professional career
On June 21, 2020, Floyd signed a one-year contract with Orlandina of the Serie A2 Basket.

On October 22, 2021, Floyd signed with Kolossos Rodou of the Greek Basket League. In 23 games, he averaged 14.6 points, 2.1 rebounds, 2.5 assists and 0.8 steals, playing around 22 minutes per contest as the team's 6th man.

On June 4, 2022, Floyd signed with JL Bourg of the LNB Pro A.

References

External links
King Tornado bio
Albany State Golden Rams bio

Living people
1997 births
American men's basketball players
American expatriate basketball people in France
American expatriate basketball people in Greece
American expatriate basketball people in Italy
Albany State Golden Rams men's basketball players
Basketball players from Georgia (U.S. state)
JL Bourg-en-Bresse players
King Tornado men's basketball players
Kolossos Rodou B.C. players
Orlandina Basket players
Point guards
Shooting guards
Sportspeople from Albany, Georgia